Sándor Hidvégi (born 9 April 1983, in Budapest) is a Hungarian football player who most recently played for BFC Siófok.

External links
MLSZ 
HLSZ 

1983 births
Living people
Footballers from Budapest
Hungarian footballers
Association football midfielders
Győri ETO FC players
Soroksári TE footballers
Jászberényi SE footballers
MTK Budapest FC players
Fehérvár FC players
Zalaegerszegi TE players
Ferencvárosi TC footballers
Nemzeti Bajnokság I players